Sir Felix Schuster, 1st Baronet (21 April 1854 — 13 May 1936) was a British banker, financier and Liberal politician.

Biography
He was educated at Frankfurt-am-Main, Geneva, and Owens College, Manchester, and then went into business in London. He was on the Royal Commission on London Traffic 1903-5, Board of Trade Commission for the Amendment of Company Law 1905, India Office Committee on Indian Railway Finance and Administration 1907-8 and Treasury Committee on Irish Land Purchase Finance 1907-8. He was chairman of the Council of the Institute of Bankers, 1908-9, and of the Central Association of Bankers, 1913–15.

In 1906 he stood as a Liberal candidate at the general election for the constituency of the City of London.

His grandchildren include the philosopher Mary Warnock and the diplomat Duncan Wilson.

Works
His works include:
Foreign Trade and the Money Market
Our Gold Reserves

See also

 Schuster Baronets
 Arthur Schuster (older brother)

Notes

References

English bankers
1854 births
1936 deaths
Baronets in the Baronetage of the United Kingdom
Liberal Party (UK) parliamentary candidates